The Jizera is a river that begins on the border between Poland and the Czech Republic (in the Liberec Region in northern Bohemia) and ends in Central Bohemian Region. It is 167.0 km long, and its basin area is about 2,200 km2, of which 2,145 km2 in the Czech Republic.

Etymology
Like some other names in Bohemia, the name Jizera is of Celtic origin, as the Celtic Boii (hence the Germanic word Bohemia, home of the Boii) lived in the area before the Roman times (see also the Isar in Germany, the IJzer in Flanders and the Isère in France) before assimilation by the Marcomanni and later Germanic and West Slavic peoples.

Geography
The river develops from the confluence of the Velká Jizera (Great Jizera) in the Jizera Mountains and the Malá Jizera (Little Jizera) in the Giant Mountains, and flows for 164 km into the Elbe in the municipality of Káraný near Brandýs nad Labem-Stará Boleslav. On its way, it intersects the Ještěd-Kozákov Ridge. For the first 15 kilometres, the river constitutes the border between Poland and the Czech Republic.

Cities and towns along the Jizera
 Benátky nad Jizerou
 Mnichovo Hradiště
 Mladá Boleslav
 Semily
 Stará Boleslav
 Turnov
 Železný Brod

Water resource
Jizera is also one of two biggest resources of potable water for the city of Prague and other neighboring villages and towns (the second one is Želivka). From Benátky nad Jizerou to its on-flow, it is surrounded by bank infiltration system, and in the municipality of Sojovice the water is being pumped for artificial infiltration.

Gallery

References

External links
 Junction of the Jizera with its tributary Mumlava (Mummel)
 Horáčková J., Ložek V. & Juřičková L. (2013). "Malakofauna v nivě Jizery (Severní Čechy). [The mollusc fauna of the Jizera floodplain (North Bohemia)]". Malacologica Bohemoslovaca 12: 48–59. PDF.

Rivers of the Central Bohemian Region
Rivers of the Liberec Region
Mladá Boleslav District
Semily District
International rivers of Europe
Czech Republic–Poland border
Border rivers